Andrew Jackson Davis (August 11, 1826January 13, 1910) was an American Spiritualist, born in Blooming Grove, New York.

Early years 
Davis had little education. In 1843 he heard lectures in Poughkeepsie on animal magnetism, the precursor of hypnotism, and came to perceive himself as having remarkable clairvoyant powers. In the following year he received, he said, spiritual messages telling him of his life work.  He described himself as "the Poughkeepsie Seer".

Work 
For the next three years (1844–1847) he practiced magnetic healing, a form of therapy regarded as pseudoscience, and in 1847 he published The Principles of Nature, Her Divine Revelations, and a Voice to Mankind, which in 1845 he had dictated while in a trance to his scribe, William Fishbough. He lectured with little success and returned to writing books, publishing about 30 in all, including
 The Great Harmonia (1850–1861), an encyclopaedia in six volumes;
 The Philosophy of Special Providences (1850), which with its evident rehash of old arguments against special providences and miracles would seem to show that Davis's inspiration was literary;
 The Penetralia; Being Harmonial Answers to Important Questions (1856), which allegedly predicted the development of the automobile, road systems, typewriter, and other modern technology years if not decades before they were developed, and claimed the speed of light was 200,000 miles per second 94 years before it was scientifically calculated by Louis Essen showing the true speed was 186,000 miles per second. 
 The Magic Staff: An Autobiography (1857), which was supplemented by Arabula: or, The Divine Guest. Containing a New Collection of New Gospels (1867), the gospels being those according to St. Confucius, St. John (John Greenleaf Whittier), St. Gabriel (Gabriel Derzhavin), St. Octavius (Octavius Frothingham), St. Gerrit (Gerrit Smith), St. Emma (Emma Harding), St. Ralph (Ralph Waldo Emerson), St. Selden (Selden J. Finney), St. Theodore (Theodore Parker), and others;
 A Stellar Key to the Summer Land (1868);
 Tale of a Physician, or, The Seeds and Fruits of Crime (1869) 
 The Fountain with Jets of New Meanings (1870)
 Views of Our Heavenly Home (1878)

Influences and legacy 
Davis was much influenced by Swedenborg and by the Shakers, who reprinted his panegyric praising Ann Lee in the official work Sketch of Shakers and Shakerism (1884).

In writing his 1845 short story "The Facts in the Case of M. Valdemar", Edgar Allan Poe was informed by Davis's early work after having attended one of his lectures on mesmerism.

Davis's complete library is now housed within the Edgar Cayce Library.

Critical reception
In 1855, Davis' spiritualism received an extensive critical analysis by theologian Asa Mahan: Modern Mysteries Explained and Exposed. In Four Parts. I. Clairvoyant Revelations of A. J. Davis... A defender of Davis published an 80-page pamphlet attacking Mahan's analysis.

Regarding Davis' book The Principles of Nature, Joseph McCabe has noted "There is no need to examine the book seriously. The scientific errors and crudities of it release any person from considering whether there was any element of revelation in it... Moreover, Davis was a palpable cheat. He maintained that up to that date he had read only one book in his life, and that book was a novel. We know from his admirers that this was not true, and any person can recognize in his pages a very crude and badly digested mess of early scientific literature."

Physician James Joseph Walsh was unconvinced Davis was a genuine clairvoyant. Walsh wrote that although Davis stated that he had only ever read one novel, this was not true as he had read Vestiges of the Natural History of Creation and there was evidence he had read books on sociology.

The spiritualist writings of Davis have been criticized by scientists and skeptics for containing inaccuracies and false information. For example, in one case, Davis seemed unaware that water is a compound of oxygen and hydrogen. Researcher Georgess McHargue pointed out that the supposed "scientific" passages from his writings are filled with "gobbledegook as to put it in the class with the most imaginative vintage science fantasy."

References

Further reading 

James Lowell Moore: Introduction to the Writings of Andrew Jackson Davis. Reprint of the ed. Boston: Christopher, 1930 (1930). Whitefish: Kessinger 2003.

External links
 A complete collection of all Davis's books is available online.
Andrew Jackson Davis at www.andrewjacksondavis.com
 
, an independent film on Andrew Jackson Davis

1826 births
1910 deaths
19th-century occultists
American spiritual mediums
Clairvoyants
People from Blooming Grove, New York